United States presidents typically fill their Cabinets and other appointive positions with people from their own political party. The first Cabinet formed by the first president, George Washington, included some of Washington's political opponents, but later presidents adopted the practice of filling their Cabinets with members of the president's party.

Appointments across party lines are uncommon. Presidents may appoint members of a different party to high-level positions in order to reduce partisanship or improve cooperation between the political parties. Also presidents often appoint members of a different party because they need Senate confirmation for many of these positions, and at the time of appointment the Senate was controlled by the opposition party of the president. Many of the cross-partisan nominees are often moderates within their own parties.

This is a list of people appointed to high-level positions in the United States federal government by a president whose political party affiliation was different from that of the appointee. The list includes executive branch appointees and independent agency appointees. Independent or nonpartisan appointees, nominally apolitical appointments (such as Article III judges and military officers), and members of explicitly bipartisan commissions are not included. A third party member has never been appointed.

List of appointees

‡ Person was an appointee of the previous administration and was reappointed or retained by the President.

Other notable appointments that crossed party lines
 President Thomas Jefferson, a Democratic-Republican, appointed William Cranch, a Federalist, as Chief Judge of the United States Circuit Court of the District of Columbia.
 President Thomas Jefferson, a Democratic-Republican, asked Charles Lee, a Federalist, to be appointed Associate Justice of the Supreme Court of the United States.
 President John Quincy Adams, a Democratic-Republican, appointed Joseph Hopkinson, a Federalist, as a U.S. federal judge on the United States District Court for the Eastern District of Pennsylvania.
 President Franklin Pierce, a Democrat, appointed Isaac Blackford, a Whig, as a judge on the United States Court of Claims.
 President Abraham Lincoln, a Republican, appointed Stephen Field, a Democrat, as Associate Justice of the Supreme Court of the United States.
 President Andrew Johnson, a Democrat, appointed Samuel Blatchford, a Republican, as Judge on the United States District Court for the Southern District of New York.
 President Andrew Johnson, a Democrat, appointed Daniel Clark, a Republican, as Judge on the United States District Court for the District of New Hampshire.
 President Rutherford B. Hayes, a Republican, appointed David M. Key, a Democrat, as Judge on the United States District Courts for the Eastern and Middle Districts of Tennessee.
 President Benjamin Harrison, a Republican, appointed Howell Edmunds Jackson, a Democrat, as Associate Justice of the Supreme Court of the United States.
 President William Howard Taft, a Republican, appointed Horace Harmon Lurton, a Democrat, as Associate Justice of the Supreme Court of the United States.
 President William Howard Taft, a Republican, appointed Edward Douglass White, a Democrat, as Chief Justice of the United States.
 President William Howard Taft, a Republican, appointed Joseph Rucker Lamar, a Democrat, as Associate Justice of the Supreme Court of the United States.
 President Warren G. Harding, a Republican, appointed Pierce Butler, a Democrat, as Associate Justice of the Supreme Court of the United States.
 President Calvin Coolidge, a Republican, appointed John Ellis Martineau, a Democrat, as Judge on the United States District Court for the Eastern District of Arkansas.
 President Herbert Hoover, a Republican, appointed Benjamin N. Cardozo, a prominent Democrat, as Associate Justice of the Supreme Court of the United States.
 President Herbert Hoover, a Republican, appointed Eugene Black, a Democrat, as a member of the U.S. Board of Tax Appeals.
 President Franklin D. Roosevelt, a Democrat, appointed Harlan F. Stone, a Republican, as Chief Justice of the United States.
 President Franklin D. Roosevelt, a Democrat, appointed Robert P. Patterson, a Republican, as Judge of the United States Court of Appeals for the Second Circuit.
 President Franklin D. Roosevelt, a Democrat, appointed William Clark, a Republican, as Judge of the United States Court of Appeals for the Third Circuit.
 President Franklin D. Roosevelt, a Democrat, appointed Duncan Lawrence Groner, a Republican, as Chief Justice of the United States Court of Appeals for the District of Columbia Circuit.
 President Harry S. Truman, a Democrat, appointed U.S. Senator Harold Hitz Burton, a Republican, as Associate Justice of the Supreme Court of the United States.
 President Harry S. Truman, a Democrat, appointed Ernest W. Gibson Jr., a Republican, as  a U.S. federal judge on the United States District Court for the District of Vermont.
 President Harry S. Truman, a Democrat, appointed Dwight D. Eisenhower, a future Republican president, as Military Governor of the U.S. Occupation Zone in Germany and later as Chief of Staff of the United States Army and Supreme Allied Commander Europe.
 President Dwight D. Eisenhower, a Republican, appointed William J. Brennan Jr., a Democrat, as Associate Justice of the Supreme Court of the United States.
 President Dwight D. Eisenhower, a Republican, appointed J. Joseph Smith, a Democrat, as a judge of the United States Court of Appeals for the Second Circuit.
 President Dwight D. Eisenhower, a Republican, appointed Clement Haynsworth, a Democrat, as a judge of the United States Court of Appeals for the Fourth Circuit.
 President John F. Kennedy, a Democrat, appointed Harold R. Tyler Jr., a Republican, as a U.S. federal judge on the United States District Court for the Southern District of New York.
 President Richard Nixon, a Republican, appointed Donald S. Russell, a former U.S. senator and Democrat, as judge of the United States Court of Appeals for the Fourth Circuit.
 President Richard Nixon, a Republican, appointed Walter R. Mansfield, a Democrat, as judge of the United States Court of Appeals for the Second Circuit.
 President Richard Nixon, a Republican, appointed Charles Clark, a Democrat, as judge of the United States Court of Appeals for the Fifth Circuit.
 President Richard Nixon, a Republican, nominated Clement Haynsworth, a Democrat, as Associate Justice of the Supreme Court of the United States.
 President Richard Nixon, a Republican, appointed Lewis F. Powell Jr., a lifelong Democrat, as Associate Justice of the Supreme Court of the United States.
 President Gerald Ford, a Republican, appointed Terry Shell, a Democrat, as Judge on the United States District Courts for the Eastern and Western Districts of Arkansas.
 President Jimmy Carter, a Democrat, appointed Frank Minis Johnson, a Republican, as judge of the United States Court of Appeals for the Fifth Circuit.
 President Jimmy Carter, a Democrat, appointed Cornelia Groefsema Kennedy, a Republican, as judge of the United States Court of Appeals for the Sixth Circuit.
 President Jimmy Carter, a Democrat, appointed Otto Richard Skopil Jr., a Republican, as judge of the United States Court of Appeals for the Ninth Circuit.
 President Ronald Reagan, a Republican, appointed U.S. Representative Sam B. Hall Jr., a Democrat, as Judge on the United States District Court for the Eastern District of Texas.
 President Ronald Reagan, a Republican, appointed Kimba Wood, a Democrat, as Judge on the United States District Court for the Southern District of New York.
 President George H. W. Bush, a Republican, appointed Sonia Sotomayor, a Democrat, as Judge on the United States District Court for the Southern District of New York.
 President Bill Clinton, a Democrat, appointed Maryanne Trump Barry, a Republican, as judge of the United States Court of Appeals for the Third Circuit.
 President Bill Clinton, a Democrat, appointed Richard C. Tallman, a Republican, as judge of the United States Court of Appeals for the Ninth Circuit.
 President Bill Clinton, a Democrat, appointed Yvette Kane, a Republican, as a U.S. federal judge on the United States District Court for the Middle District of Pennsylvania.
 President Bill Clinton, a Democrat, appointed Richard Barclay Surrick, a Republican, as a U.S. federal judge on the United States District Court for the Eastern District of Pennsylvania.
 President Bill Clinton, a Democrat, nominated Admiral Bobby Ray Inman, a Republican, as Secretary of Defense.
 President Bill Clinton, a Democrat, nominated Governor of Massachusetts William Weld, a Republican, as United States ambassador to Mexico.
 President George W. Bush, a Republican, appointed Philip Ray Martinez, a Democrat, as a U.S. federal judge on the United States District Court for the Western District of Texas.
 President George W. Bush, a Republican, appointed C. Darnell Jones II, a Democrat, as a U.S. federal judge on the United States District Court for the Eastern District of Pennsylvania.
 President George W. Bush, a Republican, appointed Legrome D. Davis, a Democrat, as a U.S. federal judge on the United States District Court for the Eastern District of Pennsylvania.
 President George W. Bush, a Republican, appointed Timothy J. Savage, a Democrat, as a U.S. federal judge on the United States District Court for the Eastern District of Pennsylvania.
 President George W. Bush, a Republican, appointed David S. Cercone, a Democrat, as a U.S. federal judge on the United States District Court for the Western District of Pennsylvania.
 President George W. Bush, a Republican, appointed Freda L. Wolfson, a Democrat, as a U.S. federal judge on the United States District Court for the District of New Jersey.
 President Barack Obama, a Democrat, nominated U.S. Senator Judd Gregg, a Republican, as United States Secretary of Commerce.
 President Barack Obama, a Democrat, appointed Matthew W. Brann, a Republican, as a U.S. federal judge on the United States District Court for the Middle District of Pennsylvania.
 President Barack Obama, a Democrat, appointed Gregory N. Stivers, a Republican, as a U.S. federal judge on the United States District Court for the Western District of Kentucky.
 President Barack Obama, a Democrat, appointed Thomas M. Durkin, a Republican, as a U.S. federal judge on the United States District Court for the Northern District of Illinois.
 President Barack Obama, a Democrat, appointed John Robert Blakey, a Republican, as a U.S. federal judge on the United States District Court for the Northern District of Illinois.
 President Barack Obama, a Democrat, appointed Jeffrey L. Schmehl, a Republican, as a U.S. federal judge on the United States District Court for the Eastern District of Pennsylvania.
 President Barack Obama, a Democrat, appointed Edward G. Smith, a Republican, as a U.S. federal judge on the United States District Court for the Eastern District of Pennsylvania.
 President Barack Obama, a Democrat, appointed Jerry Pappert, a Republican, as a U.S. federal judge on the United States District Court for the Eastern District of Pennsylvania.
 President Barack Obama, a Democrat, appointed Rebecca Goodgame Ebinger, a Republican, as a U.S. federal judge on the United States District Court for the Southern District of Iowa.
 President Barack Obama, a Democrat, appointed John Tharp, a Republican, as a U.S. federal judge on the United States District Court for the Northern District of Illinois.
 President Barack Obama, a Democrat, appointed David Barlow, a Republican, as United States Attorney for the United States District Court for the District of Utah.
 President Barack Obama, a Democrat, nominated William F. Jung, a Republican, as a U.S. federal judge on the United States District Court for the Middle District of Florida.
 President Barack Obama, a Democrat, nominated Karen Gren Scholer, a Republican, as a U.S. federal judge on the United States District Court for the Eastern District of Texas.
 President Barack Obama, a Democrat, nominated Marilyn Horan, a Republican, as a U.S. federal judge on the United States District Court for the Western District of Pennsylvania.
 President Donald Trump, a Republican, nominated Nellie Liang, a Democrat, to the Federal Reserve Board of Governors.
 President Donald Trump, a Republican, appointed Susan Paradise Baxter, a Democrat,  as a U.S. federal judge on the United States District Court for the Western District of Pennsylvania.
 President Donald Trump, a Republican, appointed Robert J. Colville, a Democrat,  as a U.S. federal judge on the United States District Court for the Western District of Pennsylvania.
 President Donald Trump, a Republican, appointed John Milton Younge, a Democrat,  as a U.S. federal judge on the United States District Court for the Eastern District of Pennsylvania.
 President Donald Trump, a Republican, appointed Lewis J. Liman, a Democrat, as a U.S. federal judge on the United States District Court for the Southern District of New York.
 President Donald Trump, a Republican, appointed Mary S. McElroy, a Democrat, as a U.S. federal judge on the United States District Court for the District of Rhode Island.
 President Donald Trump, a Republican, appointed Maryellen Noreika, a Democrat, as a U.S. federal judge on the United States District Court for the District of Delaware.
 President Donald Trump, a Republican, appointed Stephanie D. Davis, a Democrat, as a U.S. federal judge on the United States District Court for the Eastern District of Michigan.
 President Donald Trump, a Republican, nominated Hector Gonzalez, a Democrat, as a U.S. federal judge on the United States District Court for the Eastern District of New York.
 President Donald Trump, a Republican, nominated Jennifer H. Rearden, a Democrat, as a U.S. federal judge on the United States District Court for the Southern District of New York.
 President Joe Biden, a Democrat, appointed Kim Wyman, a Republican, to the Cybersecurity and Infrastructure Security Agency.

Notes

References

Key

Lists of American politicians
Political office-holders in the United States